"Isfahan" is a jazz piece credited to Billy Strayhorn and Duke Ellington and released on Ellington's 1967 album The Far East Suite; Isfahan is a city in Iran. It features long-time Ellington soloist Johnny Hodges on alto saxophone. It was originally called Elf when Strayhorn composed it, months before the 1963 Ellington orchestra world tour during which the group traveled to Iran.

Legacy
Isfahan is widely considered as a jazz standard.

In The Penguin Guide to Jazz, Richard Cook and Brian Morton have suggested that "Isfahan is arguably the most beautiful item in Ellington's and Strayhorn's entire output."

In 1988 the song was presented in Studio Sessions New York 1963 by LMR label and later on by the Saja Records.

Notable covers
 1980 - Heard Ranier Ferguson in album Heard Ranier Ferguson (Track #2)
 1980 - Gary Burton in album Easy as Pie (Track #5)
 1981 - Arnett Cobb in album Funky Butt (Track #7)
 1985 - Joe Pass in album Akron Concert (Part #1 in track #6, Duke Ellington Medley)
 1987 - Art Farmer in album Something to Live For (Track #1)
 1992 - Joe Henderson in album Lush Life (Track #1)
 1992 - Stephanie Nakasian in album French Cookin' (Track #11)
 1999 - André Previn in album We Got It Good and That Ain’t Bad: A Duke Ellington Songbook (Track #2)
 2005 - Grace Kelly in album Times Too (Track #1)
 2008 - Donny McCaslin in album "Recommended Tools" (Track #5)
 2012 - Joe Jackson with Steve Vai in album The Duke (Track #1)

Personnel
Cootie Williams — trumpet
William "Cat" Anderson — trumpet
Mercer Ellington — trumpet & flugelhorn
Herbie Jones — trumpet & flugelhorn
Lawrence Brown — trombone
Buster Cooper — trombone
Chuck Connors — trombone
Jimmy Hamilton — clarinet & tenor saxophone
Johnny Hodges — alto saxophone (solo)
Russell Procope — alto saxophone & clarinet
Paul Gonsalves — tenor saxophone
Harry Carney — baritone saxophone
Duke Ellington — piano
John Lamb — bass
Rufus Jones — drums

See also
Duke Ellington discography

References

1967 songs
Compositions by Duke Ellington
Compositions by Billy Strayhorn
Jazz songs